Iván Fernández (born 10 June  1988) is a Spanish athlete who competes for Spain internationally.

He competes in long-distance running events, mostly cross country and marathon and has been coached by Martín Fiz, and Santi Pérez. A video of  Fernández shoving a lost Abel Mutai towards the finish line during the Burlada Cross Country race, rather than passing Mutai and winning the race, went viral in January 2013. He was globally praised for his sportsmanship.

Competition record

Personal bests
Outdoor
5000 metres – 13:36.64 (2013)
10.000 metres – 28:51.41 (2014)
10 kilometres – 29:22 (2020)
Half marathon - 1:03:04 (2020)
Marathon - 2:09:55 (2020)
2000 metres steeplechase – 5:55.50 (2005)
3000 metres steeplechase – 9:05.00 (2006)

See also

Shuhei Nishida
Sueo Ōe

References

External links

You don’t need to finish first to be a champion

1988 births
Living people
Spanish athletes
Spanish marathon runners